Sormano (Valassinese  ) is a comune (municipality) in the Province of Como in the Italian region Lombardy, located about  north of Milan and about  northeast of Como. It is part of the mountain community of the Triangolo lariano, a local government with Canzo as its chief town and comprising the peninsula between the two branches of Lake Como.

Sormano borders the following municipalities: Asso, Barni, Bellagio, Caglio, Lasnigo, Magreglio, Nesso, Zelbio.

The Muro di Sormano is one of the most severe hills to have been used in road cycling. It is associated with the Giro di Lombardia.

Twin towns
 San Cipriano Picentino, Italy, since 2007

References

Cities and towns in Lombardy